Rita Grande  (born 23 March 1975) is a former tennis player from Italy.

During her career, Grande won three singles titles and five doubles titles on the WTA Tour. She also won one singles  title and three doubles titles on the ITF Women's Circuit. On 5 November 2001, she reached her best singles ranking of world No. 24. On 28 May 2001, she peaked at No. 26 in the doubles rankings.

She played the round of 16 in singles at least once in each of the Grand Slam championships, including twice consecutively at the Australian Open, in 2001 and 2002.

Following a bad elbow injury that kept her away from competition for about ten months, Rita Grande retired from professional sport in October 2005.

WTA career finals

Singles: 4 (3 titles, 1 runner-up)

Doubles: 12 (5 titles, 7 runner-ups)

ITF finals

Singles: 3 (1–2)

Doubles: 4 (3–1)

Best Grand Slam results details

Singles

Doubles

Head-to-head records
 Lindsay Davenport 0-2
 Martina Hingis 0-3
 Dominique Monami 1-3
 Dinara Safina 0-1

External links
 
 
 

1975 births
Living people
Italian female tennis players
Olympic tennis players of Italy
Tennis players from Naples
Tennis players at the 1996 Summer Olympics
Tennis players at the 2000 Summer Olympics